The electoral district of Yan Yean is an electoral district of the Victorian Legislative Assembly. It is located on the fringes of Melbourne's northern suburbs and contains the towns of Hurstbridge, Plenty, Whittlesea and Yan Yean.

Yan Yean was created for the 1992 election and has always been held by Labor, although usually marginally. The seat became notionally Liberal after the Craigieburn end of the electorate was removed due to population growth in a redistribution prior to the 2002 election, leading to  Andre Haermeyer's decision to contest Kororoit instead. Nevertheless, Labor's Danielle Green easily won the seat, winning with a margin of 9.5%.

Members for Yan Yean

Election results

See also
 Parliaments of the Australian states and territories
 List of members of the Victorian Legislative Assembly

References

External links
 Electorate profile: Yan Yean District, Victorian Electoral Commission

1992 establishments in Australia
Electoral districts of Victoria (Australia)
City of Whittlesea
Shire of Mitchell